The Fang is a 165 foot tall waterfall in Eagle County near the town of Vail, Colorado.

Popularity
The Fang gets its popularity mainly during winter months. The reason for this is because at this time of year, the waterfall will freeze into a thick ice pole, and many ice climbers enjoy climbing to the top. Climbing to the top of the waterfall is very difficult, meaning the climbers must have proper climbing equipment. Many enjoy climbing the 26 foot wide, 165 foot tall waterfall.

Waterfall Type
The Fang is a frozen waterfall and a plunge waterfall. Even when it is frozen, it will not change its shape. The reason why it is such a popular attraction for ice climbing is because very few waterfalls of this type freeze. Normal plunge waterfalls have fast plunge speeds, which makes it hard for it to freeze.

References

Waterfalls of Colorado
Landforms of Eagle County, Colorado